Major General Anders Gösta Hökmark (14 June 1920 – 15 April 1993) was a Swedish Army officer. His senior commands include postings as Chief of the Army Staff and the General Staff Corps (1976–1979) and military commander of Bergslagen Military District (1979–1983).

Early life
Hökmark was born on 14 June 1920 in Malmö Karoli Parish, Malmöhus County, the son of Anders Persson, a merchant, and his wife Clara (née Ahlgren).

Career
Hökmark was commissioned as an officer in 1942 and was assigned to South Scania Infantary Regiment (Södra skånska infanteriregementet, I 7) in Ystad with the rank of second lieutenant. He was promoted to lieutenant in 1942 and attended the Royal Swedish Army Staff College from 1949 to 1951. Hökmark was promoted to captain in 1952 and was an Aspirant in the General Staff Corps from 1953 to 1956 when he became a General Staff Corps officer. From 1959 to 1960, Hökmark served as a company commander in the Swedish UN battalion, part of the United Nations Emergency Force (UNEF), in Gaza.

Hökmark was promoted to major in Norrbotten Regiment in 1961 and served as Deputy Secretary in the 1960 Defense Management Investigation (1960 års försvarsledningsutredning) from 1961 to 1963. He was promoted to lieutenant colonel in 1964 and was head of the General Department (Allmänna avdelningen) in the Defence Staff from 1963 to 1966 and expert in the 1964 Fortification Investigation (1964 års fortifikationsutredning) from 1964 to 1965. Hökmark was then lieutenant colonel in the South Scanian Regiment in 1966 and was promoted to colonel in 1968 and appointed regimental commander of the South Scanian Regiment. In 1972, Hökmark was promoted to major general and appointed Chief of Staff of the Upper Norrland Military District. Hökmark served as Acting Chief of the Army Staff and of the General Staff Corps from 1973 to 1976 and as Chief of the Army Staff and of the General Staff Corps in 1976. Hökmark's last post was as military commander of the Bergslagen Military District from 1979 to 1983.

Personal life
In 1943 he married Anne-Marie Forneborg (1919–1986), the daughter of Johan Forneborg and Manny (née Danielsson). They had three children, Gunnar Hökmark, Harald Hökmark and Kåre Hökmark.

Death
Hökmark died on 15 April 1993 in Förslöv Parish, Kristianstad County. He was interred on 15 May 1993 at Förslöv Cemetery.

Dates of rank
1942 – Second lieutenant
1944 – Lieutenant
1952 – Captain
1961 – Major
1966 – Lieutenant colonel
1968 – Colonel
1972 – Major general

Awards and decorations
  Commander 1st Class of the Order of the Sword (6 June 1974)
  Commander Order of the Sword (6 juni 1972)
  Knight 1st Class of the Order of the Sword (1961)

Honours
Member of the Royal Swedish Academy of War Sciences (1974)

Bibliography

References

1920 births
1993 deaths
Swedish Army major generals
People from Malmö
Members of the Royal Swedish Academy of War Sciences
Commanders First Class of the Order of the Sword